There have been two baronetcies created for persons with the surname Nevill, both in the Baronetage of England. Both creations are extinct.

The Nevill Baronetcy, of Holt in the County of Leicester, was created in the Baronetage of England on 25 May 1661 for Thomas Nevill. The title became extinct on his death in 1712.

The Nevill Baronetcy, of Grove in the County of Nottingham, was created in the Baronetage of England on 24 February 1675 for Edward Nevill, subsequently Member of Parliament for East Retford. He was a descendant of Sir Robert Nevill, of Eldon, fourth son of Ralph Neville, 2nd Baron Neville de Raby (great-uncle of Ralph de Neville, 1st Earl of Westmorland). Nevill was childless and the title became extinct on his death in 1685.

Nevill baronets, of Holt (1661)
Sir Thomas Nevill, 1st Baronet (–1712)

Nevill baronets, of Grove (1675)
Sir Edward Nevill, 1st Baronet (–1685)

See also
Baron Neville de Raby
Earl of Westmorland
Neville Baronets

References

Extinct baronetcies in the Baronetage of England
1661 establishments in England